"" is a cavatina from Gioachino Rossini's 1816 opera The Barber of Seville, sung by the tenor Count Almaviva, disguised as the poor student Lindoro, at the beginning of act 1.

Music

The aria is an example of the bel canto style. The key signature is C major, but it also modulates into G major and contains chromatic passages. Its vocal range is from F to B; the tessitura is between G and G. The aria is also notable for having a guitar accompaniment.

Libretto

References

External links
, Juan Diego Flórez, Royal Opera House, 10 July 2010

Arias by Gioacchino Rossini
Opera excerpts
1816 compositions